Quedius curtipennis is a beetle found in Britain. It is similar in appearance to Quedius fuliginosus, which is a less common species, however, the eyes of fuliginosus are more convex and the basal antennal segments darker. The punctures on the elytra are slightly stronger in Q. curtipennis.

References

Staphylininae
Beetles of Europe
Beetles described in 1908